This is Opera is a Spanish television documentary series created and directed by Ramon Gener. The show explores opera in unconventional ways to try to attract not just existing opera fans, but also those less familiar with the art form. The host guides the viewer to the places of origin of each opera, and explores the culture, history—and modern and current trends and how they apply to opera.

The show premiered on Servus TV in Austria and Germany on 17 January 2015, on La 2 in Spain on 8 March 2015, on RAI 5 in Italy on 15 May 2015, and on 19 August 2015, on Foxtel Arts in Australia.

Reception 
Many people uninterested in opera find the program and the host entertaining. This style of edutainment makes the show reach a wider audience, but also attracts those already from music circles.

The series has received nominations from festivals: This is Opera was nominated in the Rocky Awards in the BANFF festival under the category of music and variety. It was also chosen for the IDFA festival in November 2015. Most recently, it has been nominated at the Rose d'Or Festival in the category of Arts for its episode of Turandot.

Host 

Ramon Gener, writer and musician, is the host. With the dramatic aspect of opera, Gener tries to transmit ideas or thoughts on life—for example the idea of sharing, which he states in an interview, "All that you have, share it with the world for if you don't what use is it in having?" He has hosted other shows, and has been involved in Television programs since early 2011.

Gener has done various interviews concerning his writings, and This is Opera  in which he discusses his first experiences with music and how the show came to be.

Season 1

Season 2

References

External links 
 
 
 Ramon Gener, website

2015 Spanish television series debuts
RTVE shows
2015 Spanish television series endings